Architectural patterns are often documented as software design patterns. An architectural pattern often uses the same description as a general, reusable solution to a commonly occurring problem in software architecture within a given context.

The separation of what is architectural and what is design is not commonly agreed, nor are the patterns catalogued in any accepted form.

Software Architecture is an ambiguous term which not only relates to the discipline of software architecture itself, but also structure and connections between components.

An Introduction to Software Architecture describes it as such "We are still far from having a well-accepted taxonomy of such architectural paradigms, let alone a fully-developed theory of software architecture. But we can now clearly identify a number of architectural patterns, or styles, that currently form the basic repertoire of a software architect."

Catalog of architectural patterns

Multitier architecture
Model–view–controller
Domain-driven design
Blackboard pattern
Sensor–controller–actuator
Presentation–abstraction–control
Component-based
Monolithic application
Layered
Pipes and filters
Database-centric 
Blackboard
Rule-based
Event-driven aka implicit invocation
Publish-subscribe
Asynchronous messaging
Microkernel
Reflection
Client-server (multitier architecture exhibits this style)
Shared nothing architecture
Space-based architecture
Object request broker
Peer-to-peer
Representational state transfer (REST)
Service-oriented
Cloud computing patterns

References 

Architectural pattern (computer science)
Software design patterns